Publius Cornelius Scipio Barbatus was a Roman statesman who served as the Consul in 328 BC and Dictator in 306 BC. His primary duty as dictator was to hold the comitia to elect new consuls. He later served as Pontifex maximus.

References

4th-century BC Roman consuls
Ancient Roman dictators
Barbatus, Publius
Year of birth unknown
Year of death unknown